Diaporos Island is an island of about one and a half square miles in the Singitic Gulf, Chalkidiki, northern Greece.

In 1950 it had no inhabitants, however since the 1980s many private holiday homes have been built on the island. The summer period sees many visitors especially for the beach at Galana Nera. The permanent population at the 2011 census was 2 inhabitants.

Sources
 Columbia-Lippincott Gazetteer, p. 512.

Islands of Greece
Landforms of Chalkidiki
Islands of Central Macedonia